Platytes duplicilinea is a moth in the family Crambidae. It was described by George Hampson in 1919. It is found in Ghana and Sierra Leone.

References

Crambini
Moths described in 1919
Moths of Africa